Oyster Bay Cove is a village located within the Town of Oyster Bay in Nassau County, on Long island, in New York. The population was 2,197 at the 2010 census.

Youngs Memorial Cemetery, resting place of President Theodore Roosevelt, is located in the village.

History 
The village incorporated in 1931, and on January 14, 1932, residents unanimously voted in George T. Bowdoin as the first Mayor of Oyster Bay Cove.

The village expanded its borders through annexations in 1963.

Geography

Demographics

At the 2000 census there were 2,262 people, 725 households, and 633 families in the village. The population density was 538.1 people per square mile (207.9/km). There were 742 housing units at an average density of 176.5 per square mile (68.2/km).  The racial makeup of the village was 90.23% White, 5.97% Asian, 1.77% African American, 0.09% Native American, 0.97% from other races, and 0.97% from two or more races. Hispanic or Latino of any race were 1.68%.

Of the 725 households 42.5% had children under the age of 18 living with them, 82.3% were married couples living together, 3.4% had a female householder with no male present, and 12.6% were non-families. 9.9% of households were one person and 4.3% were one person aged 65 or older. The average household size was 3.12 and the average family size was 3.31.

The age distribution was 28.4% under the age of 18, 5.5% from 18 to 24, 21.9% from 25 to 44, 32.3% from 45 to 64, and 11.9% 65 or older. The median age was 42 years. For every 100 females, there were 94.7 males. For every 100 females age 18 and over, there were 98.5 males.

The median household income was in excess $200,000, as is the median family income . Males had a median income of over $100,000 versus $53,750 for females. The per capita income for the village was $103,203. About 1.3% of families and 2.6% of the population were below the poverty line, including 0.8% of those under age 18 and 5.6% of those age 65 or over.

Education

School districts 
Oyster Bay Cove is primarily within the boundaries of (and is thus served by) the Oyster Bay–East Norwich Central School District. However, southern portions and some of the easternmost extremes of the village are served by the Syosset Central School District and the Cold Spring Harbor Central School District, respectively. As such, students who attend public schools and reside in Oyster Bay Cove attend school in one of these three districts depending on where they live in the village.

Library districts 
Oyster Bay Cove is located within the boundaries of Cold Spring Harbor's library district, the Oyster Bay–East Norwich Library District, and the Syosset Library District. The boundaries of these districts within the village roughly correspond with those of the school districts.

References

Oyster Bay (town), New York
Villages in New York (state)
Villages in Nassau County, New York
Populated coastal places in New York (state)